Julia Mary Deans (born 27 August 1974) is a New Zealand singer-songwriter best known as the lead singer of rock band Fur Patrol.

Banshee Reel 

In the early '90s Deans joined Wellington-based Celtic rock band Banshee Reel. The group released two albums – Culture Vulture (1993) and An Orchestrated Litany of Lies (1995). Banshee Reel toured extensively around New Zealand and overseas. In 1996, after returning to New Zealand from a Canadian tour, Deans and Wellington guitarist Steve Wells decided to form a rock group, which was to become Fur Patrol.

Fur Patrol 

Fur Patrol released three albums – Pet (2000), Collider (2003) and Local Kid (2008) and had a number one single with "Lydia" in 2000. The band moved to Melbourne in 2001 to focus on a wider Australian audience. After the lack of success with their third album Local Kid, Fur Patrol went on hiatus.

Solo career and The Adults 

With a number of songs she had written over the years but thought unsuitable for Fur Patrol, Deans was encouraged by her record company to record a solo album. This became Modern Fables, released in 2010. It was well received and was short-listed for the Taite Music Prize, with single "A New Dialogue" long-listed for the APRA Silver Scroll award.

Deans then became part of The Adults, a musical collaboration between established New Zealand musicians such as Jon Toogood, Shayne Carter, Tiki Taane and Ladi6. In 2011 the group released a self-titled album which was nominated for Album of the Year at the 2012 New Zealand Music Awards.

In 2012, Deans released new single "Broken Home". She also embarked on a theatrical project, starring with Jon Toogood in Silo Theatre's production of Brel: The Words and Music of Jacques Brel.

In 2013, Deans performed at the Taite Music Prize ceremony in April. Later in the year, Deans and Anika Moa recorded a cover version of "2000 Miles" for the charity album Starship Christmas Album 2013.

Discography

Albums

With Banshee Reel
 Culture Vulture (1993) 
 An Orchestrated Litany of Lies (1995)
 "Lament" (1995) NZ: #42

With Fur Patrol

 Pet (2000) Wishbone Music
 Collider (2003) Universal Music Australia
 Local Kid (2008) Tardus Music

With The Adults

 The Adults (2011) Warner Music NZ

Singles

Music videos

Awards

References

External links 
 Julia Deans at Facebook
 Julia Deans at MySpace
 Fur Patrol at MySpace
 The Adults

APRA Award winners
New Zealand songwriters
New Zealand rock singers
Living people
1974 births
People from Wellington City
New Zealand guitarists
Deans, Julia
21st-century New Zealand  women singers
21st-century women guitarists
The Adults members
New Zealand women in electronic music